"Fantasy" is a song by the English singer-songwriter George Michael. It was first released in 1990 as the B-side of his single "Waiting for That Day" (and "Freedom! '90" in the US). On 7 September 2017, a new version reworked by Nile Rodgers was released as a single from Listen Without Prejudice / MTV Unplugged (2017). The single was released posthumously, more than eight months after Michael's death on 25 December 2016.

Background
"Fantasy", written and produced by Michael, was recorded while he was working on Listen Without Prejudice Vol. 1. However, the track was not included on the album. Instead in October 1990, it was featured on the "Waiting for That Day" single in the United Kingdom and on the "Freedom! '90" single in the rest of the world. In 1998, a remixed version of "Fantasy" was featured on the "Outside" single. The original version of the song was included later on Michael's albums: Ladies & Gentlemen: The Best of George Michael (1998), Twenty Five (2006) and Faith (2011 edition). On 7 September 2017, a new version reworked by Nile Rodgers was released as a single from Listen Without Prejudice / MTV Unplugged (2017). The album includes the original version of "Fantasy" and the 1998 version; the Nile Rodgers remix was not included on the disc but was made available to purchasers as a digital download.  On 18 October 2017, a music video was released on Vevo.

Track listing
Digital single
"Fantasy" (featuring Nile Rodgers) – 4:02

Promotional single
"Fantasy" (featuring Nile Rodgers) (Radio Edit) – 3:37

Versions
"Fantasy" – 5:00
"Fantasy '98" – 4:30
"Fantasy" (featuring Nile Rodgers) – 4:02
"Fantasy" (featuring Nile Rodgers) (Radio Edit) – 3:37

Charts

Release history

References

2017 singles
1990 songs
George Michael songs
Song recordings produced by George Michael
Songs released posthumously
Songs written by George Michael
Sony Music UK singles